Manhaul Glacier is a glacier flowing from the east slopes of Mount Humphrey Lloyd to enter Edisto Inlet just south of Luther Peak, in Victoria Land, Antarctica. It was so named by the New Zealand Geological Survey Antarctic Expedition (NZGSAE), 1957–58, because the seaward tongue of this glacier which is afloat was crossed several times during the season by NZGSAE parties using man-hauling methods of transport.

References

Glaciers of Victoria Land
Borchgrevink Coast